Ashish Kumar (born 18 July 1994) is an Indian amateur boxer who competes in the middleweight category. He won a silver medal at the 2019 Asian Championships and a gold medal at 2019 Thailand Open International Boxing Tournament held in Bangkok. He also won bronze medal at 2020 Asia/Oceania Olympics Qualifier and represented India in middleweight category at 2020 Olympics held in Tokyo, Japan.

Early and personal life
Ashish Kumar was born on 18 July 1994 in Dhanotu, Mandi district, Himachal Pradesh to Bhagat Ram Dogra and Durga Devi. His father was a farmer and played kabaddi at the national level. Kumar was inspired  to take up boxing by his brothers and cousins who have competed at national and international levels in Boxing, Wrestling and Wushu.

Kumar's father passed away a month before Kumar competed at the 2020 Olympic Qualification Tournament in Amman, Jordan. He went on to reach semifinals of the event and won a bronze medal and therefore qualified for the 2020 Olympic Games in Tokyo.

Career
Kumar won his first National Games Gold medal in 2015 in Kerala. He won his debut international medal as a silver medalist at the 2019 Asian Amateur Boxing Championships in Bangkok in the middleweight category. He won Gold medal in 2019 at Thailand Open International Boxing Tournament held in Bangkok. He played in middleweight category for Gujarat Giants in maiden Big Bout Indian Boxing League held in 2019. Gujarat Giants won the league and Ashish Kumar was declared Player of the Tie in the final match. In March 2020, Kumar reached the semifinals of the 2020 Asia & Oceania Boxing Olympic Qualification Tournament in Amman, Jordan and qualified for the 2020 Summer Olympics.  He is the first boxer ever from Himachal Pradesh to qualify for Olympics.

Awards and recognition 

 Parshuram Award (2019): Parshuram Award is the highest award in the field of sports given by Himachal Pradesh Government. It was presented to Ashish Kumar by the Chief Minister of Himachal Pradesh on the occasion of 49th statehood day.

References

1994 births
Living people
Indian male boxers
Middleweight boxers
People from Mandi district
Sportspeople from Himachal Pradesh
Boxers at the 2020 Summer Olympics
Olympic boxers of India
Boxers at the 2022 Commonwealth Games
Commonwealth Games competitors for India